Xiaoliang Sunney Xie (born 1962 in Beijing, China) is a Chinese American biophysicist well known for his contributions to the fields of single-molecule biophysical chemistry, coherent Raman Imaging and single-molecule genomics.

Early life
He received his B.Sc. in Chemistry from Peking University in 1984, and his Ph.D. in Physical Chemistry in 1990 from University of California at San Diego. After a brief postdoctoral appointment at University of Chicago, he joined  Pacific Northwest National Laboratory, where he rose from Senior Research Scientist to Chief Scientist. In 1998, he became the first tenured professor recruited by Harvard University among Chinese Scholars who came to the United States since Chinese economic reform.

Research
He had been the Mallinckrodt Professor of Chemistry and Chemical Biology at Harvard University until 2018, when he became the Lee Shau-kee Professor of Peking University. He was the Director of Biomedical Pioneering Innovation Center (BIOPIC) in 2010-2021, and the Director of Beijing Advanced Innovation Center for Genomics (ICG) in 2016-2021, both at Peking University.

As a pioneer of single-molecule biophysical chemistry, Coherent Raman scattering microscopy, and single-cell genomics, he made major contributions to the emergence of these fields. Furthermore, he has made significant advances on medical applications of label-free optical imaging and single-cell genomics. In particular, his inventions in single-cell genomics have been used in in vitro fertilization benefited thousands of families by avoiding the transmission of monogenic diseases to their newborns.

More than fifty of his students and post-doctorates have become professors at major universities around the world, and two are co-founders of start-up companies.
Professor Xie’s current research interests include the following scientific, technological, and medical areas:
 Scientific: Single-molecule enzymology, Single-molecule biophysical chemistry, Gene expression and regulation, Epigenetics, Mechanism of cell differentiation and reprogramming, Chromosome structure and dynamics, and Genomic instability; 
 Technological: Single-molecule imaging, Single-cell genomics, Coherent Raman scattering microscopy, DNA sequencing; 
 Medical: Preimplantation genetic testing in in vitro fertilization, COVID19 vaccine and neutralizing antibody drugs for SARS-CoV-2 variants and Early cancer diagnosis.

Honors and awards
 2017: Qiu Shi Outstanding Scientist Award, Qiu Shi Science & Technologies Foundation
 2017: Foreign member of the Chinese Academy of Sciences
 2016: Member of the National Academy of Medicine
 2015: Albany Medical Center Prize
 2015: Peter Debye Award in Physical Chemistry, American Chemical Society
 2014: Fellow of the Optical Society of America
 2013: NIH Director's Pioneer Award
 2013: Ellis R. Lippincott Award, Optical Society of America and Society for Applied Spectroscopy
 2012: Edward Mack, Jr. Lecture, OSU
 2012: Harrison Howe Award, Rochester Section of the American Chemical Society
 2012: Fellow of the American Academy of Microbiology
 2012: Biophysical Society Founders Award
 2011: Member of the National Academy of Sciences
 2009: Ernest Orlando Lawrence Award
 2008: Fellow of the American Physical Society
 2008: Berthold Leibinger Zukunftspreis for Applied Laser Technology
 2008: Fellow of the American Academy of Arts and Sciences
 2007: Willis E. Lamb Award for Laser Sciences and Quantum Optics
 2006: Fellow of Biophysical Society
 2006: Fellow of the American Association for the Advancement of Science
 2004: NIH Director's Pioneer Award
 2003: Raymond and Beverly Sackler Prize in the Physical Sciences
 1996: Coblentz Award

Selected Literature

COVID-19 Research 

 Cao, Yunlong; Yisimayi, Ayijiang; Jian, Fanchong; Song, Weiliang; Xiao, Tianhe; Wang, Lei; Du, Shuo; Wang, Jing; Wang, Jing; Li, Qianqian; Chen, Xiaosu; Yu, Yuanling; Wang, Peng; Zhang, Zhiying; Liu, Pulan; An, Ran; Hao, Xiaohua; Wang, Yao; Wang, Jing; Feng, Rui; Sun, Haiyan; Zhao, Lijuan; Zhang, Wen; Zhao, Dong; Zheng, Jiang; Yu, Lingling; Li, Can; Zhang, Na; Wang, Rui; Niu, Xiao; Yang, Sijie; Song, Xuetao; Chai, Yangyang; He, Ye; Shi, Yansong; Zheng, Linlin; Li, Zhiqiang; Gu, Qingqing; Shao, Fei; Huang, Weijin; Jin, Ronghua; Shen, Zhongyang; Wang, Youchun; Wang, Xiangxi; Xiao, Junyu; Xie, Xiaoliang Sunney "BA.2.12.1, BA.4 and BA.5 escape antibodies elicited by Omicron infection," Nature DOI: 10.1038/s41422-021-00555-0 (2022)
 Cao, Yunlong; Wang, Jing; Jian, Fanchong; Xiao, Tianhe; Song, Weiliang; Yasimayi, Ayijiang; Huang, Weijin; Li, Qianqian; Wang, Peng; An, Ran; Wang, Jing; Wang, Yao; Niu, Xiao; Yang, Sijie; Liang, Hui; Sun, Haiyan; Li, Tao; Yu, Yuanling; Cui, Qianqian; Liu, Shuo; Yang, Xiaodong; Du, Shuo; Zhang, Zhiying; Hao, Xiaohua; Shao, Fei; Jin, Ronghua; Wang, Xiangxi; Xiao, Junyu; Wang, Youchun; Xie, Xiaoliang Sunney "Omicron escapes the majority of existing SARS-CoV-2 neutralizing antibodies," Nature 602, 657-663 DOI: 10.1038/s41586-021-04385-3 (2021)
 Cao, Yunlong; Yisimayi, Ayijiang; Bai, Yali; Huang, Weijin; Li, Xiaofeng; Zhang, Zhiying; Yuan, Tianjiao; An, Ran; Wang, Jing; Xiao, Tianhe; Du, Shuo; Ma, Wenping; Song, Liyang; Li, Yongzheng; Li, Xiang; Song, Weiliang; Wu, Jiajing; Liu, Shuo; Li, Xuemei; Zhang, Yonghong; Su, Bin; Guo, Xianghua; Wei, Yangyang; Gao, Chuanping; Zhang, Nana; Zhang, Yifei; Dou, Yang; Xu, Xiaoyu; Shi, Rui; Lu, Bai; Jin, Ronghua; Ma, Yingmin; Qin, Chengfeng; Wang, Youchun; Feng, Yingmei; Xiao, Junyu; Xie, Xiaoliang Sunney "Humoral immune response to circulating SARS-CoV-2 variants elicited by inactivated and RBD-subunit vaccines," Cell Research 31(7), 732-741 DOI: 10.1038/s41422-021-00514-9 (2021)
 Du, Shuo; Cao, Yunlong; Zhu, Qinyu; YU, Pin; Qi, Feifei; Wang, Guopeng; Du, Xiaoxia; Bao, Linlin; Deng, Wei; Zhu, Hua; Liu, Jiangning; Nie, Jianhui; Zheng, Yinghui; Liang, Haoyu; Liu, Ruixue; Gong, Shuran; Liu, Jiangning; Xu, Hua; Yisimayi, Ayijiang; Lv, Qi; Wang, Bo; He, Runsheng; Han, Yunlin; Zhao, Wenjie; Bai, Yali; Qu, Yajin; Gao, Xiang; Ji, Chenggong; Wang, Qisheng; Gao, Ning; Huang, Weijin; Wang, Youchun; Xie, X. Sunney; Su, Xiao-dong; Xiao, Junyu; Qin, Chuan "Structurally resolved SARS-CoV-2 antibody shows high efficacy in severely infected hamsters and provides a potent cocktail pairing strategy," Cell 183(4), 1013-1023.e13 DOI: 10.1016/j.cell.2020.09.035 (2020)
 Cao, Yunlong; Su, Bin; Guo, Xianghua; Sun, Wenjie; Deng, Yongqiang; Bao, Linlin; Zhu, Qinyu; Zhang, Xu; Zheng, Yinghui; Geng, Chenyang; Chai, Xiaoran; He, Runsheng; Li, Xiaofeng; Lv, Qi; Zhu, Hua; Deng, Wei; Xu, Yanfeng; Wang, Yanjun; Qiao, Luxin; Tan, Yafang; Song, Liyang; Wang, Guopeng; Du, Xiaoxia; Gao, Ning; Liu, Jiangning; Xiao, Junyu; Su, Xiaodong; Du, Zongmin; Feng, Yingmei; Qin, Chuan; Qin, Chengfeng; Jin, Ronghua; Xie, X. Sunney "Potent Neutralizing Antibodies against SARS-CoV-2 Identified by High-Throughput Single-Cell Sequencing of Convalescent Patients' B Cells," Cell 182(1), 73-84.e16 DOI: 10.1016/j.cell.2020.05.025 (2020)

Single-Cell Genomics

Gene Expression and Regulation

Single Molecule Enzymology

Coherent Raman Imaging

Single Molecule Imaging

See also
 Cho Minhaeng

References

External links
 Homepage of the Xie Group at Harvard

1962 births
Living people
Harvard University faculty
Peking University alumni
University of California, San Diego alumni
University of Chicago alumni
Fellows of the American Association for the Advancement of Science
Fellows of the American Academy of Arts and Sciences
Spectroscopists
Members of the United States National Academy of Sciences
Scientists from Beijing
Chinese emigrants to the United States
Foreign members of the Chinese Academy of Sciences
Members of the National Academy of Medicine